The Andersonville Trial is an American television adaptation of a 1959 hit Broadway play by Saul Levitt. It was presented as an episode of the PBS anthology series Hollywood Television Theatre on  May 17, 1970.

Description
The movie was based on the actual 1865 trial of Henry Wirz, played by Richard Basehart, commander of the infamous Confederate Andersonville prison, where thousands of Union prisoners died of exposure, malnutrition, and disease.  A notable cast included William Shatner as the Chief JAG Prosecutor Norton Parker Chipman, Jack Cassidy (who was nominated for an Emmy) as Wirz's defense counsel, Cameron Mitchell as Lew Wallace, a Union general and the future author of Ben-Hur,  and Buddy Ebsen as a Georgia physician called in to testify about the fate of many of the Union prisoners.

The television adaptation was directed by actor George C. Scott, who had played Chipman in the original stage version.

In Leonard Probst's 1978 compilation of celebrity interviews titled Off Camera, Scott explained that what he found most difficult about playing Chipman onstage was that Henry Wirz, the defendant, came across as a tragic, sympathetic victim, although his negligence, according to the verdict, had a great deal to do with the deplorable conditions at Andersonville, and Scott found it very difficult to deal with the fact that the audience was compelled to dislike Chipman, who was, essentially, the hero of the piece, due to his efforts to obtain justice for all the men who suffered and died at the camp.

The TV production of the play won 1971 Emmy Awards for "Outstanding Single Program", for "Technical Direction and Electronic Camerawork", and for Levitt's adaptation. It was also honored with a Peabody Award.

Cast and characters
William Shatner as Lt. Col. Norton P. Chipman
Cameron Mitchell as Maj. Gen. Lew Wallace
Richard Basehart as Capt. Henry Wirz
Jack Cassidy as Otis Baker
Martin Sheen as Capt. Williams
Buddy Ebsen as Dr. John Bates
Albert Salmi as James Gray
John Anderson as Ambrose Spencer
Michael Burns as James Davidson
Woodrow Parfrey as Louis Schade
Harry Townes as Col. Chandler
Whit Bissell as Dr. Ford
Alan Hale, Jr. as court-martial board member
Ian Wolfe as court-martial board member
Ford Rainey as court-martial board member
Dallas McKennon as First Guard
Lou Frizzell as Jasper Culver (Frizzell was the only member of the original Broadway cast to appear in this production)
Robert Easton as Court Reporter

References

Bibliography
Brooks, Tim and March, Earle, The Complete Directory to Prime Time Network and Cable TV Shows

External links

The Andersonville Trial (Broadway play) at Internet Broadway Database
 Hollywood Television Theatre 1970

American television films
American Civil War films
Peabody Award-winning broadcasts
Television shows based on plays
1970 television films
1970 films
Films directed by George C. Scott
Films set in 1865
1970s American films